This is a list of public art in the London Borough of Hammersmith and Fulham.

Fulham

Hammersmith

Shepherd's Bush

See also
 Statue of Michael Jackson (Fulham F.C.), which stood outside Craven Cottage stadium from 2011 to 2013

References

External links
 

Hammersmith and Fulham
Hammersmith and Fulham
Tourist attractions in the London Borough of Hammersmith and Fulham